Iván Erquiaga (born 26 March 1998) is an Argentine professional footballer who plays as a left-back for Quilmes.

Club career
Erquiaga started his footballing career with spells at Defensores de Vivoratá, Los Patos de Balcarce and Aldosivi; prior to joining Estudiantes in 2015. He was first an unused substitute for an Argentine Primera División fixture with Belgrano on 20 April 2018, prior to making his professional debut on 14 May during a 1–1 draw away to Rosario Central. Erquiaga's next appearance coincided with his continental bow when he was selected for a Copa Libertadores encounter against Grêmio in August.

On 17 February 2021, Erquiaga joined Huracan on a one-year loan with a purchase option of 1,200,000 dollars for 80% of his pass. Erquiaga made a total of six appearances for Huracan, before returning to Estudiantes. In January 2022, Erquiaga joined Quilmes on a deal until the end of 2023.

International career
Erquiaga has previously been selected by the Argentina U20s for training.

Career statistics
.

References

External links

1998 births
Living people
Argentine people of Basque descent
Sportspeople from Buenos Aires Province
Argentine footballers
Association football defenders
Argentine Primera División players
Primera Nacional players
Aldosivi footballers
Estudiantes de La Plata footballers
Club Atlético Huracán footballers
Quilmes Atlético Club footballers